Othoniel "Junior" Gonzalez (born September 26, 1977) is an American professional soccer coach.  He is currently an assistant coach for Chicago Fire FC, and had previous coaching positions with LA Galaxy II, Seattle Sounders FC, Chivas USA and was head coach with Rio Grande Valley FC Toros.  Junior attended UCLA where he played on the Men's NCAA soccer team and won the NCAA Division I Men's Soccer Championship in 1997.

Gonzalez's coaching career began in 2001 as an assistant coach for the University of California, Riverside men's program.  Three years later he became the head coach and under his tenure 30 players were named All-Big West Conference – including two Big West Conference Players of the Year – and six players went on to MLS and USL careers. In 2011, Gonzalez was named the Big West Coach of the Year.

As a player, Gonzalez won the 1997 NCAA National Championship with UCLA. His collegiate career included four trips to the NCAA tournament and three Mountain Pacific Conference Championships. Gonzalez continued his playing career with the USL's San Diego Flash and his career continued throughout California before his final stop with the Utah Blitz.

During 2019, Gonzalez was the interim manager for LA Galaxy II.

References

1977 births
Living people
American soccer coaches
UCLA Bruins men's soccer players
Rio Grande Valley FC Toros coaches
Association footballers not categorized by position
UC Riverside Highlanders men's soccer coaches
Chivas USA non-playing staff
Tacoma Defiance coaches
LA Galaxy non-playing staff
LA Galaxy II coaches
San Diego Flash players
Utah Blitzz players
American soccer players